Frederick Clapp may refer to:

 Frederick Mortimer Clapp (1879–1969), curator, poet and art historian
 Frederick Gardner Clapp (1879–1944), American petroleum geologist